Klaudia Edina Gallovits-Hall (née Gallovits; born December 10, 1984) is a  Romanian-born American tennis player. Her career-high ranking of No. 54 she achieved on April 28, 2008. She represented Romania until April 2015, then started playing for the United States.

Personal life
She married her American coach and manager Bryce Hall in November 2010.
Her father was in the 1980 Olympics representing Romania in the Modern Pentathlon.  
Her sister played tennis at Florida State University.

Career
In June 2007, she reached the final of the inaugural Barcelona KIA event.

In February 2010, she won her first WTA title in doubles at the Copa Sony Ericsson Colsanitas in Bogotá. Her second doubles title came in September 2010 at the Guangzhou International Women's Open.

In 2011, she defended her 2010 Bogotá title, winning the Copa Sony Ericsson Colsanitas with Anabel Medina Garrigues.

At the 2015 US Open, she played her last match on the tour. She was beaten in the first round of qualifying by Japanese Mayo Hibi in three sets.

Grand Slam performance timelines 
Only main-draw results in WTA Tour, Grand Slam tournaments, Fed Cup and Olympic Games are included in win–loss records.

Note: Gallovits-Hall played under Romanian flag until 2015.

Singles

Doubles

Significant finals

WTA Premier Mandatory & 5 finals

Doubles: 1 runner-up

WTA Career finals

Singles: 1 runner-up

Doubles: 4 (3 titles, 1 runner–up)

ITF finals

Singles: 28 (19 titles, 9 runner-ups)

Doubles: 22 (9 titles, 13 runner-ups)

Notes

References

External links

 
 
 

1984 births
Living people
Sportspeople from Timișoara
Romanian female tennis players
Romanian sportspeople of Hungarian descent